Gone with Golson is the fifth album by saxophonist Benny Golson featuring performances recorded in 1959 and originally released on the New Jazz label.

Reception

The Allmusic review by Scott Yanow described the album as "a fine example of hard bop of the late '50s".

Track listing
All compositions by Benny Golson, except where noted.
 "Staccato Swing" (Ray Bryant) – 4:49    
 "Autumn Leaves" (Joseph Kosma, Johnny Mercer, Jacques Prévert) – 6:48    
 "Soul Me" – 6:37    
 "Blues After Dark" – 8:37    
 "Jam for Bobbie" – 9:21    
 "A Bit of Heaven" (Curtis Fuller) – 4:21 Bonus track on CD

Personnel
 Benny Golson – tenor saxophone
 Curtis Fuller – trombone 
 Ray Bryant – piano
 Tommy Bryant – bass
 Al Harewood – drums

References 

New Jazz Records albums
Benny Golson albums
1959 albums
Albums produced by Esmond Edwards
Albums recorded at Van Gelder Studio